Santo Stefano di Camastra (Sicilian: Santu Stèfanu di Camastra) is a comune (municipality) in the Metropolitan City of Messina in the Italian region Sicily, located about 100 km east of Palermo and about 135 km west of Messina.  

Santo Stefano di Camastra borders the following municipalities: Caronia, Mistretta, Reitano.
  
The comune contains the Palazzo Trabia, currently the Civic Museum of Ceramics. The town, along with a few others in Sicily, is known for its ceramics painted in bright colors.

References

Cities and towns in Sicily